American singer and songwriter Lauren Daigle has received various awards and nominations. She is the recipient of four American Music Awards, six Billboard Music Awards, eleven  GMA Dove Awards and two Grammy Awards.

Released by Centricity in 2015, her debut album How Can It Be has been certified platinum and earned several awards, including a Billboard Music Award for Top Christian Album and a Billboard Music Award for Best Christian Song ("How Can It Be").

American Music Awards
The American Music Awards (AMAs) is an annual music awards show created by Dick Clark in 1973. Daigle has won four awards from six nominations.

Billboard Music Awards
The Billboard Music Awards are held to honour artists for commercial performance in the U.S., based on record charts published by Billboard. Daigle has won six awards from nine nominations.

!
|-
|rowspan=3|2017 || Lauren Daigle || Top Christian Artist ||  || 
|-
|How Can It Be|| Top Christian Album ||  || 
|-
| "Trust in You" || Top Christian Song ||  || 
|-
|rowspan=3|2019|| Lauren Daigle || Top Christian Artist ||  || 
|-
|| Look Up Child|| Top Christian Album||  || 
|-
|| "You Say"|| Top Christian Song||  || 
|-
|rowspan=2|2020
|| Lauren Daigle || Top Christian Artist ||  || 
|-
|| "Rescue" || Top Christian Song ||  || 
|-
|2022 || Lauren Daigle || Top Christian Artist ||  || 
|}

GMA Dove Awards
Daigle has won 11 awards from 21 nominations.

!
|-
|rowspan="3"| 2015 || Lauren Daigle || New Artist of the Year ||  || 
|-
| "How Can It Be" || Pop/Contemporary Song of the Year ||  || 
|-
| "How Can It Be" || Song of the Year ||  || 
|-
|rowspan="6"| 2016 || rowspan="3" | Lauren Daigle || Songwriter of the Year ||  || 
|-
| Contemporary Christian Artist of the Year ||  || 
|-
| Artist of the Year ||  || 
|-
| "Trust in You" || Song of the Year ||  || 
|-
| "First" || Song of the Year ||  || 
|-
| "Trust in You" || Pop/Contemporary Recorded Song of the Year ||  || 
|-
|rowspan="5"| 2017 || "Come Alive (Dry Bones)" || Song of the Year ||  || 
|-
| Lauren Daigle || Songwriter of the Year ||  || 
|-
| "Hard Love" || Rock/Contemporary Recorded Song of the Year ||  || 
|-
| "Come Alive (Dry Bones)" || Pop/Contemporary Recorded Song of the Year ||  || 
|-
| Behold || Christmas / Special Event Album of the Year ||  || 
|-
| rowspan="2" | 2018 || rowspan="2" | "O'Lord" || Song of the Year ||  || 
|-
| Pop/Contemporary Recorded Song of the Year ||  || 
|-
|rowspan="6"| 2019 || "You Say" || Song of the Year ||  || 
|-
| rowspan="3" | Lauren Daigle || Songwriter of the Year (Artist) ||  || 
|-
| Contemporary Christian Artist of the Year ||  || 
|-
| Artist of the Year ||  || 
|-
| "You Say" || Pop/Contemporary Recorded Song of the Year ||  || 
|-
| Look Up Child || Pop/Contemporary Album of the Year ||  || 
|-
|rowspan="4"| 2020 || "Rescue" || Song of the Year ||  || 
|-
| rowspan="2" | Lauren Daigle || Songwriter of the Year (Artist) ||  || 
|-
| Artist of the Year ||  || 
|-
| "Rescue" || Pop/Contemporary Recorded Song of the Year ||  || 
|-
|rowspan="5"| 2021 || "Hold on to Me" || Song of the Year ||  || 
|-
| Lauren Daigle || Artist of the Year ||  || 
|-
| "A Place Called Earth"  || Rock/Contemporary Recorded Song of the Year ||  || 
|-
| "Hold on to Me" || Pop/Contemporary Recorded Song of the Year ||  || 
|-
| Hold on to Me || Short Form Video of the Year ||  ||

Grammy Awards 
The Grammy Awards are awarded annually by the Recording Academy of the United States for outstanding achievements in the music industry. Often considered the highest music honour, the awards were established in 1958. Daigle has received 15 awards from 18 nominations.

!
|-
|2016
|How Can It Be
|Best Contemporary Christian Music Album
|
| 
|-
|2017
|"Trust in You"
|rowspan="2"|Best Contemporary Christian Music Performance/Song
|
| 
|-
|rowspan="2"|2019
| "You Say"
| 
| 
|-
|Look Up Child
|Best Contemporary Christian Music Album
|
| 
|}

References

Lists of awards received by American musician